The following events occurred in May 1937:

May 1, 1937 (Saturday)
26,000 London bus drivers went on strike.
The Siege of Santuario de Nuestra Señora de la Cabeza ended in Republican victory.
The Neutrality Act of 1937 became legally binding for all American citizens. Only oil and nonmilitary vehicles were excluded.
Sunderland defeated Preston North End 3-1 in the FA Cup Final at Wembley Stadium.
The Order of the German Eagle was created in Nazi Germany.
Born: Una Stubbs, actress and dancer, in Welwyn Garden City, England (d. 2021)
Died: Snitz Edwards, 69?, Hungarian-born American actor

May 2, 1937 (Sunday)
Austrian police raided the headquarters of the Nazi Party in Vienna, finding evidence of collaboration between German and Austrian Nazis, as well as propaganda hostile to the Austrian government.
Born: Gisela Elsner, writer, in Nuremberg, Germany (d. 1992); Lorenzo Music, actor, television producer and musician, in Brooklyn, New York (d. 2001)

May 3, 1937 (Monday)
Six days of civil violence known as the May Days began in Catalonia.
Born: Hans Cieslarczyk, footballer, in Herne, Germany (d. 2020)

May 4, 1937 (Tuesday)
The Duke of Windsor and Wallis Warfield (ex-Simpson) reunited in France after six months apart and immediately became officially engaged.
The Non-Intervention Committee asked both sides in the Spanish Civil War to forswear bombing of open cities.
Born: Ron Carter, jazz double-bassist, in Ferndale, Michigan; Dick Dale, surf rock guitarist, in Boston, Massachusetts (d. 2019)
Died: Noel Rosa, 26, Brazilian musician

May 5, 1937 (Wednesday)
Spanish Prime Minister Francisco Largo Caballero sent the Guardia de Asalto to Barcelona to put down the May Days violence.
British Prime Minister Stanley Baldwin pleaded for labour peace ahead of the coronation of George VI as the bus strike threatened to spread.
Born: Rubin "Hurricane" Carter, boxer, in Clifton, New Jersey (d. 2014); Trần Đức Lương, 5th President of Vietnam, in Quảng Ngãi Province, French Indochina

May 6, 1937 (Thursday)
The Hindenburg disaster occurred in Lakehurst, New Jersey, killing 36 people. Newsreel footage of the tragedy would be shown around the world, shattering the public's confidence in the dirigible as a method of transportation. Radio reporter Herbert Morrison's live report of the disaster ("Oh, the humanity!") remains one of the most famous broadcasts in history.
The National Federation of Press Women was organized.

May 7, 1937 (Friday)
German aviation minister Hermann Göring ordered work rushed on the LZ 130 LZ 130 Graf Zeppelin II, which was to have been the sister ship of the Hindenburg.
The U.S. Congress passed neutrality legislation permitting the sale of certain commodities (excluding munitions) while making it illegal for U.S. citizens to travel on belligerent ships.
The musical film Shall We Dance starring Fred Astaire and Ginger Rogers was released. This film introduced the famous George and Ira Gershwin songs "Let's Call the Whole Thing Off" and "They Can't Take That Away from Me".
Died: George Topîrceanu, 51, Romanian poet, short story writer and humorist

May 8, 1937 (Saturday)
Italy recalled its news correspondents from London and banned all British newspapers except for the Daily Mail, The Observer and The Evening News. The move was believed to have been taken in reaction to the British press mocking the recent defeats of Italian troops in the Spanish Civil War.
War Admiral won the Kentucky Derby.
Widnes defeated Keighley 18-5 to win rugby's Challenge Cup in front of 47,699 at Wembley Stadium.
The Montreux Convention Regarding the Abolition of the Capitulations in Egypt was concluded.
The adventure film The Prince and the Pauper starring Errol Flynn and Billy and Bobby Mauch was released.
Born: Mike Cuellar, baseball player, in Santa Clara, Cuba (d. 2010); Carlos Gaviria Díaz, justice and politician, in Sopetrán, Colombia (d. 2015); Thomas Pynchon, novelist, in Glen Cove, New York

May 9, 1937 (Sunday)
5,000 women and children began to evacuate Bilbao. 
More than 50 were injured in Toulouse when a riot broke out between political factions. The rioting began when rightists paraded to an equestrian statue of Joan of Arc shouting "France for the French", referring to the allegation that the Popular Front government of Prime Minister Léon Blum took orders from Moscow.

May 10, 1937 (Monday)
Frozen food came to Britain when frozen asparagus went on sale for the first time.

May 11, 1937 (Tuesday)
George VI met all the representatives of England's Dominions and colonies and pledged to carry on his father's work "for the welfare of our great empire." The speech made no mention of his brother Edward.
The adventure film Captains Courageous starring Freddie Bartholomew and Spencer Tracy was released.

May 12, 1937 (Wednesday)
The Coronation of King George VI and Queen Elizabeth took place at Westminster Abbey in London.
BBC Television made its first outdoor broadcast to cover the king's coronation procession.
Born: George Carlin, comedian, in Manhattan, New York (d. 2008)
Died: Carl Emil Pettersson, 61, Swedish sailor

May 13, 1937 (Thursday)
The British destroyer  struck a naval mine south of Almería, Spain and took severe damage, killing 8.
Antisemitic rioting broke out in three towns near Brześć-Litewski, Poland after a police officer pushed a Jewish butcher and was stabbed to death by the butcher's son. Jewish-owned stores were looted and at least 53 Jews were injured during violence that continued into the next morning.
Born: Trevor Baylis, inventor, in Kilburn, London (d. 2018); Roch Carrier, author, in Sainte-Justine, Quebec, Canada; Roger Zelazny, poet and author, in Euclid, Ohio (d. 1995)
Died: John Clem, 85, American army general

May 14, 1937 (Friday)
The 8th Imperial Conference began in London.
The Governor of Puerto Rico Blanton Winship signed a bill providing for sterilization of the insane and the establishment of a eugenics board.

May 15, 1937 (Saturday)
Valencia endured the most intensive Nationalist aerial bombardment yet made on the city, killing more than 30 people. The British embassy there was damaged and two staff members wounded.
Francisco Largo Caballero resigned as Prime Minister of Spain after the Socialists and Communists withdrew participation from his cabinet over his desire to give POUM clemency.
"September in the Rain" by Guy Lombardo topped the American pop charts.
War Admiral won the Preakness Stakes.
Born: Madeleine Albright, Czechoslovakian-born American politician and diplomat, in Prague (d. 2022); Trini Lopez, musician and actor, in Dallas, Texas (d. 2020)
Died: Philip Snowden, 1st Viscount Snowden, 72, British politician

May 16, 1937 (Sunday)
Nationalists came within seven miles of the Basque capital of Bilbao, pushing the Republicans out of the village of Gorocica.
Born: Yvonne Craig, actress, in Taylorville, Illinois (d. 2015)

May 17, 1937 (Monday)
Juan Negrín became Prime Minister of Spain.
Råsunda Stadium was formally inaugurated in Stockholm, Sweden. England defeated Sweden in a friendly, 4-0. 
Born: Hazel R. O'Leary, United States Secretary of Energy, in Newport News, Virginia

May 18, 1937 (Tuesday)
The wedding of the Duke of Windsor and Wallis Warfield was set for June 3 at the Château de Candé in Monts, France.
Outgoing Prime Minister Stanley Baldwin made the last significant speech of his time in office, in which he asked the youth of Britain to guard against the threats of fascism and communism and said that the League of Nations was of "doubtful" value. 
Archbishop of Chicago George Mundelein made the paper hanger speech, an anti-Nazi speech that condemned the Nazi totalitarianism and spoke about how "a nation of 60 million intelligent people will submit in fear and servitude" to Hitler, whom he called an "alien, an Austrian paper hanger."
Born: Brooks Robinson, baseball player, in Little Rock, Arkansas; Jacques Santer, 22nd Prime Minister of Luxembourg and President of the European Commission, in Wasserbillig, Luxembourg

May 19, 1937 (Wednesday)
The press in Nazi Germany demanded that the Vatican publicly repudiate the Archbishop of Chicago George Mundelein for his remarks. "The cardinal insulted not only the head of the German state and its ministers but the entire German nation", an editorial in Der Angriff stated. "We make the Catholic church responsible if the speech evokes a new wave of anti-German agitation, and we ask the Vatican if it intends to tolerate this speech without protest."
King Victor Emmanuel III and Queen Elena of Italy made an official visit to Budapest. 
Angry about being called for a balk during the sixth inning of a game against the New York Giants, Dizzy Dean of the St. Louis Cardinals began throwing at Giants batters in the top of the ninth. When Dean went to cover first base on a bunt by Jimmy Ripple, the two got into a fistfight that started a bench-clearing brawl.

May 20, 1937 (Thursday)
George VI conducted a fleet review. This was the occasion of the famous Thomas Woodrooffe incident, when the BBC Radio commentator went on the air drunk and repeatedly slurred the phrase, "the fleet's lit up."
The Soviet Union executed 44 people as spies for Japan.
Denny Shute won the 20th PGA Championship at Pittsburgh Field Club in Fox Chapel, Pennsylvania.
Died: Walter Davis, 48, Welsh footballer

May 21, 1937 (Friday)
The bodies of the 26 German victims of the Hindenburg tragedy arrived in Cuxhaven by ship. A state funeral was held in a local hall.
The Soviet Union established the North Pole-1 station in the Arctic Ocean.
Born: Sofiko Chiaureli, actress, in Tbilisi, Émile Bolduc, Georgian SSR (d. 2008); John Fairfax, rower and adventurer, in Italy (d. 2012); Mengistu Haile Mariam, President of Ethiopia, in Addis Ababa, Ethiopia;

May 22, 1937 (Saturday)
The Soviet Union claimed the North Pole as its territory.
Soviet military leader Mikhail Tukhachevsky was arrested and charged with conspiring against the government and spying for Nazi Germany.

May 23, 1937 (Sunday)
3,840 children evacuated from the Spanish Civil War arrived in Southampton.
Leon Trotsky outlined a Fourth International to oppose Joseph Stalin.
Died: John D. Rockefeller, 97, American business magnate and philanthropist

May 24, 1937 (Monday)
Republican warplanes bombed a patrol boat of the Italian Navy, killing several sailors.
Soviet politician Jānis Rudzutaks was arrested and accused of Trotskyism and espionage for Nazi Germany.
The U.S. Supreme Court decided Helvering v. Davis and Steward Machine Co. v. Davis.
Born: Roger Peterson, pilot of the aircraft on "The Day the Music Died", in Alta, Iowa (d. 1959)
Died: Luis F. Álvarez, 84, Spanish American physician

May 25, 1937 (Tuesday)
The Exposition Internationale des Arts et Techniques dans la Vie Moderne (International Exposition dedicated to Art and Technology in Modern Life) opened in Paris.
Detroit Tigers star Mickey Cochrane suffered a career-ending, near-fatal injury when he was hit by a beanball pitched by Bump Hadley of the New York Yankees.
An editorial in Mussolini's Il Popolo d'Italia warned the Jews of Italy to cease making criticisms of Germany, because such opposition was "irreconcilable with the friendship that binds us to Germany and which has objectives far more vast and fundamental than the Jewish question."
Born: Mark Shields, American journalist and political commentator (d. 2022)
Died: Henry Ossawa Tanner, 77, African-American artist

May 26, 1937 (Wednesday)
Egypt joined the League of Nations. This would prove to be the last country to do so.
The Little Steel strike began in the United States.
The London bus strike ended.
The boxing film Kid Galahad starring Edward G. Robinson, Bette Davis, Humphrey Bogart and newcomer Wayne Morris in the title role was released.

May 27, 1937 (Thursday)
The Golden Gate Bridge opened in San Francisco.
The Gestapo ordered 200 German Catholic newspapers to shut down for publishing articles critical of Nazi institutions.

May 28, 1937 (Friday)
Neville Chamberlain became Prime Minister of the United Kingdom when Stanley Baldwin retired. Chamberlain signalled an intention to continue Baldwin's policies by making very few changes to the cabinet. 
In the final act of the Baldwin government, the London Gazette announced that Wallis Warfield would not be elevated to royal status upon her marriage to the Duke of Windsor, and would only be entitled to be addressed in the forms appropriate to a woman who was married to a duke but was not of royal blood. The ruling also applied to any children she might have with the Duke. 
The Volkswagen company was founded.
Born: Robert Chrisman, poet, scholar and publisher, in Yuma, Arizona (d. 2013)
Died: Alfred Adler, 67, Austrian medical doctor and psychotherapist

May 29, 1937 (Saturday)
Deutschland incident: Republican planes bombed the German cruiser .

May 30, 1937 (Sunday)
Memorial Day massacre: In Chicago, police fired on marching union members at the Republic Steel plant, killing 10.
The steamship Ciudad de Barcelona carrying volunteers of the International Brigades was torpedoed and sunk by an Italian submarine off the coast of Malgrat de Mar.

May 31, 1937 (Monday)
Bombardment of Almería: German warships bombarded the city of Almería in retaliation for the Deutschland incident.
The Republicans launched the Segovia Offensive.
Italy and Germany decided to withdraw from the non-intervention cordon around Spain.
Senjūrō Hayashi resigned as Prime Minister of Japan.
Wilbur Shaw won the Indianapolis 500.
Born: Louis Hayes, jazz drummer, in Detroit, Michigan
Died: Yan Gamarnik, 42, Soviet military commander (suicide)

References

1937
1937-05
1937-05